Bahramand Tangi is a Pakistani politician who has been a Member of the Senate of Pakistan, since March 2018.

Political career
Tangi was elected to the Senate of Pakistan as a candidate of Pakistan Peoples Party on general seat from Khyber Pakhtunkhwa in 2018 Pakistani Senate election. He took oath as Senator on 12 March 2018.

References

Living people
Pakistan People's Party politicians
Year of birth missing (living people)
Members of the Senate of Pakistan